Dmitry Sergeevich Ulyanov (born 12 January 1983) is a retired Russian alpine skier who competed in the 2006 Winter Olympics.

References

External links
 sports-reference.com

1983 births
Living people
Russian male alpine skiers
Olympic alpine skiers of Russia
Alpine skiers at the 2006 Winter Olympics
People from Yuzhno-Sakhalinsk
Sportspeople from Sakhalin Oblast